Oberea ishigakiana is a species of beetle in the family Cerambycidae. It was described by Masaki Matsushita in 1941.

References

ishigakiana
Beetles described in 1941